The 38th Biathlon World Championships were held in 2003 in Khanty-Mansiysk, Russia.

Men's results

20 km individual

10 km sprint

12.5 km pursuit

15 km mass start

4 × 7.5 km relay

Women's results

15 km individual

7.5 km sprint

10 km pursuit

The photo finish could not separate the top duo.

12.5 km mass start

4 × 6 km relay

Medal table

References

2003
Biathlon World Championships
International sports competitions hosted by Russia
2003 in Russian sport
Biathlon
March 2003 sports events in Russia
Biathlon competitions in Russia